Zambia is officially a Christian country by constitution. Christianity is the state religion in Zambia according to the 1996 constitution, and the vast majority of Zambians (95.5%) are Christians of various denominations, but many other religious traditions are present. Traditional religious thought blends easily with Christian beliefs in many of the country's syncretic churches. Other religions include the Baháʼí Faith, Islam, Hinduism, Sikhism, and Judaism. Ismaili Muslim, Hindu and Sikh communities exist owing to the Indian and Pakistani diasporic community.

The 2010 census found that 75.3% of Zambians were Protestant, 20.2% were Catholic, 0.5% were Muslim, 2.0% followed other religions, and 1.8% had no religion. However, according to the World Christian Database 82.3% of the population were Christian, 10.4% were indigenous religions, 0.5% were Baháʼí, 2.2% were Muslim, 4.6% were agnostic, and all other groups including Hindu were counted as 0.2%, in 2015.

Background
Zambia gained independence in 1964 from the British Empire. Post independence, Pentecostal and charismatic missionaries from the United States were met with a wide audience in the 1970s. The growth of the religion suffered during the 80s and 90s on account of increased economic turmoil. After Frederick Chiluba (a Pentecostal Christian) became President in 1991, Pentecostal congregations expanded considerably around the country. While the initial constitution did not specify religion, the amendment in 1996 declared the nation as "a Christian nation while upholding the right of every person to enjoy the person's freedom of conscience and religion". As per Article 1 of the constitution, the nation is a Sovereign Secular Republic and as per Article 25, citizens free to express thoughts and practice any religion.

In September 2021 the newly elected president, Hakainde Hichilema, disbanded the Ministry of National Guidance and Religious Affairs and put regulating religions under the control of the Office of the Vice President.

Organization 
The government requires religious groups to affiliate with a "mother body" which in 2021 were 14 in number.   The Christian ones were Zambia Conference of Catholic Bishops (ZCCB), Council of Churches in Zambia (CCZ), and Evangelical Fellowship of Zambia (EFZ), Independent Churches of Zambia, Apostles Council of Churches, Seventh-day Adventist Church, and Christian Missions in Many Lands.  The non-Christian ones were Islamic Supreme Council of Zambia, Hindu Association of Zambia, Guru Nanak Council of Zambia, Jewish Board of Deputies Zambia, Rastafarians, Council for Zambia Jewry, and Baha’i Faith in Zambia.

Christianity 

Christianity is believed to have arrived in Zambia in the form of European Protestant missionaries and African explorers during the mid of 19th century. David Livingstone was a Scottish missionary who did pioneering missionary work that brought the attention of Africa to the Western world. Livingstone inspired abolitionists of the slave trade, explorers and missionaries. He led the way in Central Africa to missionaries who initiated the education and health care for Africans. Many African chiefs and tribes held him in high esteem and it was one of the major reasons for facilitating relations between them and the British.

Zambia is officially a Christian nation according to the 1996 constitution, but a wide variety of religious traditions exist. Traditional religious thought blends easily with Christian beliefs in many of the country's syncretic churches. Christian denominations include: Presbyterianism, Catholic, Anglican, Pentecostal, New Apostolic Church, Lutheran, Seventh-day Adventist, Jehovah's Witnesses, The Church of Jesus Christ of Latter-day Saints, Branhamism, and a variety of Evangelical denominations. These grew, adjusted and prospered from the original Catholic missionary settlements (Portuguese influences) in the east from Mozambique and Anglicanism (English and Scottish influences) from the south. Except for some technical positions (e.g. physicians), Western missionary roles have been assumed by native believers. Zambia has one of the largest communities of Jehovah's Witnesses in Africa with close to 200,000 members.

Baháʼí Faith 

The Association of Religion Data Archives (relying on World Christian Encyclopedia) reported Zambia as having the eighth highest population of followers of the Baháʼí Faith, with 241,100, representing 1.80% of the population, placing it at fourth overall in that measure, in 2010. However the official website of the Bahá'í Community of Zambia reported 4,000 Bahá'ís in 2018 and the UNdata reported 3,891 Bahá'ís in 2015.

The William Mmutle Masetlha Foundation, an organization founded in 1995 and run by the Zambian Baháʼí community, is particularly active in areas such as literacy and primary health care. The Maseltha Institute, its parent organization, was founded earlier in 1983.

Islam

Islam arrived in Zambia in the form of Arab slave traders during the mid of 18th century. Other Muslims and people from Hindu community arrived to Zambia during British Colonial rule. In 2014, there are 59.000 Muslims in Zambia, representing 0.4% of total population. The vast majority of Muslims in Zambia are Sunni. An Ismaili Shia community is also present. About 500 people in Zambia belong to the Ahmadiyya sect of Islam.

Others 

There is also a small Jewish community, composed mostly of Ashkenazis. Notable Jewish Zambians have included Simon Zukas, retired Minister, MP and a member of Forum for Democracy and Development and earlier the MMD and United National Independence Party. Additionally, the economist Stanley Fischer, currently the governor of the Bank of Israel and formerly head of the IMF was born and partially raised in Zambia's Jewish community.

Notable sects, such as the Alice Lenshina–led Lumpa Church and the newly established Last Church of Order also exist.

See also

Church of the Province of Central Africa (Anglican)
Catholicism in Zambia
Council of Churches in Zambia
Demographics of Zambia
Religion in Africa

References

 
Society of Zambia
Zambian culture